is a 1954 Japanese drama film directed by Mikio Naruse. It follows four retired geisha and their struggles to make ends meet in post World War II Japan. The film is based on three short stories by female author Fumiko Hayashi.

Plot
Late Chrysanthemums interweaves the lives of four retired geisha in Tokyo over a period of four successive days. Kin, the first of the geisha, is a moneylender and a merciless businesswoman, who is insistent upon being repaid by her former geisha sisters Tamae, Tomi and Nobu. Her financial advisor Itaya tries to convince her to buy land in the countryside, as prices are constantly rising.

Tamae and Tomi, both former geisha and widows, live together. Tamae is plagued by migraines, and as a result, unable to work as frequently as she would like to as a maid in a hotel. She is also unhappy with her son Kiyoshi's relationship with an older mistress, who pays him for being at her service. Tomi is unable to repay her debts as a result of her addiction to gambling. She laments her daughter Sachiko's upcoming marriage to an older man and tries to persuade her against it. Nobu, the fourth of the geisha, runs a restaurant with her husband, which is frequented by the other women.

Seki, a former customer of Kin, who was sent to prison after he had attempted to kill her and commit suicide, tries to borrow money from her, but is quickly turned away. Kin then becomes excited when she hears that ex-soldier Tabe, her former patron and lover, is returning. To her disappointment, Tabe wants to borrow her money as well. She rejects his request and burns his photograph to cut all remaining ties.

Tamae and Tomi are eventually left alone when Kiyoshi leaves for Hokkaido for a job and Sachiko moves in with her future husband. Kin hears from Nobu that Seki was arrested for a money-related crime, but shrugs it off. She enters the train with Itaya to inspect property in the countryside which she considers buying.

Cast
 Haruko Sugimura as Kin
 Chikako Hosokawa as Tamae
 Yūko Mochizuki as Tomi
 Sadako Sawamura as Nobu
 Ken Uehara as Tabe
 Hiroshi Koizumi as Kiyoshi
 Ineko Arima as Sachiko
 Bontaro Miake as Seki
 Sonosuke Sawamura as Sentaro
 Daisuke Katō as Itaya

Literary source
Late Chrysanthemums is based on Fumiko Hayashi's short stories Bangiku (Late Chrysanthemum, 1948), Shirasagi (1949) and Suisen (Narcissus, 1949). The story Bangiku, on which the episode about the character Kin is based, has been translated into English by Lane Dunlop and is available in the anthology A Late Chrysanthemum: Twenty-One Stories from the Japanese.

Reception
Late Chrysanthemums is often considered one of Naruse's finest works. Keith Uhlich of Slant awarded the film a full four stars and called it "Naruse's most perfect film". It also received four critics' votes in the British Film Institute's 2012 Sight & Sound poll.

References

External links
 
 
 

1954 films
1954 drama films
Japanese drama films
1950s Japanese-language films
Japanese black-and-white films
Films based on short fiction
Films based on works by Fumiko Hayashi
Films set in Japan
Films directed by Mikio Naruse
Toho films
Films about geisha
Films produced by Sanezumi Fujimoto
Films scored by Ichirō Saitō
Films based on multiple works
1950s Japanese films